was a Japanese modern pentathlete. He competed at the 1960 and 1964 Summer Olympics.

References

External links
 

1931 births
2016 deaths
Japanese male modern pentathletes
Olympic modern pentathletes of Japan
Modern pentathletes at the 1960 Summer Olympics
Modern pentathletes at the 1964 Summer Olympics
People from Miyazaki Prefecture
20th-century Japanese people
21st-century Japanese people